The Empyrean is the eighth solo album by American musician John Frusciante, released worldwide on January 20, 2009 through Record Collection. Frusciante did not plan on a following tour, as he instead wanted to focus on writing and recording. The Empyrean peaked at number 151 on the US Billboard 200 as well as number seven on the Top Heatseekers. On release it made number 105 on the UK Albums Chart.

Frusciante said that the record "was recorded on and off between December 2006 and March 2008," and is a concept album that tells "a single story both musically and lyrically." The Empyrean contains a version of Tim Buckley's "Song to the Siren", from his 1970 album Starsailor. The record also features an array of collaborators and guest musicians, including Frusciante's bandmate Flea, and friends Josh Klinghoffer and the former Smiths guitarist Johnny Marr. Due to an error at the duplication plant, the United States CD release date was delayed until January 27. On June 2, 2010, a new bonus track, Here, Air, was added to the album, freely available at John's website.

On December 11, 2012, Record Collection re-issued various John Frusciante albums released from 2004 to 2009, including The Empyrean.   These re-issued albums are available on 180 gram limited edition vinyl. Each LP also comes with a download card for your choice of MP3 or WAV file. The Empyrean was one of the most sought after John Frusciante LPs from the 2012 catalog reissue.  According to John Frusciante's official website, the pre-order of the limited edition vinyl was sold out as of November 24, 2012; therefore, making it the first from the limited catalog reissue to do so.  Additional stock of recording would be available in 2013.

A ten-year anniversary reissue, recut by John Frusciante and Bernie Grundman from the original analog tapes, was released on March 29, 2019. The reissue is a double disc LP that includes a download card of the album plus bonus tracks in hi-resolution.

A song which was written during The Empyrean sessions, "Scratch", was released as a free download on February 18, 2014 as an introductory track to the full-length record Enclosure released April 8, 2014.

At Metacritic, which assigns a weighted mean rating out of 100 to reviews from mainstream critics, the album received an average score of 69, based on 8 reviews, which indicates "generally favorable reviews."

Album artwork 
The artwork is a photograph of prints arranged to form a collage. The upper left region of the image contains various references to the natural world, such as the multiple images of green leaved trees and several superimposed images of mountains. Considering John's philosophy on life, it is plausible to draw that this arrangement is a reference to the Tree of life.

In the lower left corner, the presence of tree roots and semi-transparent fallen leaves reinforces the idea of the Tree of life.

Josh Klinghoffer, John's personal friend (whom he has collaborated with previously, as well as on The Empyrean) is pictured laying next to a skull, and connected to the angelic figure of John. This is a reference to death and rebirth, which is confirmed through John's blog posts. The two figures are connected through means of a rope or string. Considering the religious themes of the album (song titles "God" and "Heaven" are present on the album), it is plausible to draw the conclusion that this is a reference to God and Jesus. However John's figure could be interpreted as being Dante's Satan due to the similarity between the multiple pairs of wings and heads.

The helical staircase leading from the dead figure's resting place signifies rebirth and improvement until it reaches the highest point in heaven. The palace above the clouds is the representation John chooses to take of this concept. The album artwork is representative of the musical content of the album. This is reinforced through John's content in his blog posts.

Track listing

Personnel
John Frusciante – lead vocals, lead and rhythm guitar, acoustic guitar, keyboards, piano, synthesizers, Bass VI on "Dark/Light" and "Central", drum machine, backing vocals
Josh Klinghoffer – drums, percussion, electric piano, organ, piano, synthesizers, backing vocals
Flea – bass guitar on "Unreachable", "God", "Heaven", "Enough of Me", "Today", and "Ah Yom"
Johnny Marr – electric guitar on "Enough of Me", electric and acoustic guitar on "Central"
Donald Taylor and the New Dimension Singers – backing vocals on "Dark/Light"
Lawrence Young – backing vocals on "Dark/Light"
Sonus Quartet – strings
Geoff Gallegof – string arrangement on "God" and "One More of Me"
Neel Hammond – string arrangement on "Enough of Me"
Vanessa Freebairn-Smith – string arrangement on "Central"

Production
Ryan Hewitt – recording engineer
Adam Samuels – recording engineer
Dave Lee – instrument tech
Sarah Sitkin – cover art
Anthony Zamora – production coordination

Charts

References

John Frusciante albums
2009 albums